The Anti-Terrorism Act of 2020, officially designated as Republic Act No. 11479, is a counter-terrorism law intended to prevent, prohibit, and penalize terrorism in the Philippines. The law was passed by the 18th Congress and signed by President Rodrigo Duterte on July 3, 2020, effectively replacing the Human Security Act of 2007 on July 18, 2020.

A total of 37 petitions were filed before the Supreme Court of the Philippines challenging the law's constitutionality, making it the most assailed piece of legislation in Philippine history. On December 9, 2021, the Court announced that apart from two unconstitutional portions of the law, all other challenged provisions thereof are declared not unconstitutional.

Overview

Definition of terrorism 
The Act defines terrorism as:
 Engaging in acts intended to cause death or serious bodily injury to any person or endangers a person's life;
 Engaging in acts intended to cause extensive damage or destruction to a government or public facility, public place, or private property;
 Engaging in acts intended to cause extensive interference with, damage, or destruction to critical infrastructure;
 Developing, manufacturing, possessing, acquiring, transporting, supplying, or using weapons; and
 Releasing dangerous substances or causing fire, floods or explosions when the purpose is to intimidate the general public, create an atmosphere to spread a message of fear, provoke or influence by intimidation the government or any international organization, seriously destabilize or destroy the fundamental political, economic, or social structures in the country, or create a public emergency or seriously undermine public safety

The definition states that "advocacy, protest, dissent, stoppage of work, industrial or mass action, and other similar exercises of civil and political rights" shall not be considered as terrorist acts only if they "are not intended to cause death or serious physical harm to a person, to endanger a person's life, or to create a serious risk to public safety."

Creation of Anti-Terrorism Council 
The law also creates a presidentially-appointed body, the Anti-Terrorism Council (ATC), which would designate the persons who could be arrested as "terrorists."

Because of other provisions of the law.  these persons could be detained for up to 24 days (14 days with a possible 10-day extension), and would not be automatically compensated for wrongful imprisonment as they originally were under the Human Security Act of 2007.

Warrantless arrest
The law allows suspects to be detained without a judicial warrant of arrest for 14 days and can be extended by 10 more days, and placed under surveillance for 60 days, that can also be extended by up to 30 days, by the police or military. But an analyst argues that this provision is essential for counterterrorism to "allow more time for investigators to get valuable information from the terror suspect. A longer detention period can also provide ample time to facilitate interrogation. It can also incapacitate the suspected terrorist from wreaking havoc. Most importantly, longer preventive detention can lawfully hold suspect when usual criminal charges cannot be filed for some technical considerations."

Removal of safeguard against wrongful detention 
The Anti-Terrorism Act of 2020 also removes a section under the Human Security Act of 2007 which is meant to safeguard against the wrongful accusation and detention of suspects. Previously, if a person imprisoned under the HSA were found to actually not be guilty, that person would be compensated for wrongful detention, with the cost "automatically charged against the appropriations of the police agency or the Anti-Terrorism Council that brought or sanctioned the filing of the charges against the accused."

Under the new law, a wrongfully detained person would have to file a suit against the government in order to get any remuneration for having been wrongfully accused.

Background

Branding of "rebel groups" in Philippine history 
Conflicts with ideologically motivated groups, both armed and unarmed have frequently been labeled "terrorists," "rebels," and "bandits" throughout the Philippines' history.

Groups branded "insurrectos" during the colonial era and World War II 
During the colonial era, forces fighting for Filipino independence, such as those under Diego Silang, Andres Bonifacio, Emilio Aguinaldo, and Macario Sakay were intentionally labeled "insurrectos" and "bandits"  in order to de-legitimize and downplay their cause. In the 1930s, the Hukbalahap of the Partido Komunista ng Pilipinas (PKP-1930) was one of the most active guerrilla forces fighting for Filipino freedom during World War II, but it found itself in conflict with the newly independent Philippine government after the war, until it was effectively defeated in the 1950s.

Opposition groups during the Marcos administration 
A new communist organization, the Communist Party of the Philippines (CPP), was formed in 1969, and although it was still small, the Philippine government used its formation to take advantage of the cold war red scare in the United States to increase the influx of defense support funds from the US. A 1968 Philippine senate investigation into the Jabidah massacre, in which Muslim recruits were supposedly massacred in Corregidor to prevent them from blowing the cover on a botched Military operation resulted in the rise of multiple secessionist movements in the Muslim-majority areas in western Mindanao Island, including the Muslim Independence Movement, the Bangsamoro Liberation Organization. President Ferdinand Marcos cited the new communist and moro separatist movements among his reasons for declaring martial law in 1972, but also used his powers to "emasculate all the leaders" of the political opposition, allowing him to hold authoritarian power over the Philippines for more than two decades.

While martial law decimated the leadership of the political opposition, it radicalized otherwise "moderate" young people of the time, leading to the rapid growth of the Communist Party of the Philippines' New People's Army. In western Mindanao, the Moro National Liberation Front (MNLF) and the Moro Islamic Liberation Front (MILF) became the dominant voice of Muslim separatism after the burning of Jolo in 1974. In northern Luzon, the murder of Macli-ing Dulag for his opposition to the Marcos administration's Chico River Dam project became a rallying cry which inspired the formation of militant groups such as the Cordillera People's Liberation Army (CPLA).

On the other hand, the martial law saw the creation of human rights advocacy groups across the whole political spectrum, with civil society groups such as the Movement of Concerned Citizens for Civil Liberties and the Free Legal Assistance Group were joined even by church groups such as the National Council of Churches in the Philippines, Association of Major Religious Superiors in the Philippines, and Catholic Bishops' Conference of the Philippines, and by business groups such as the Makati Business Club, in actively fighting the proliferation of human rights abuses during the period.

Conflicts after 1986 
After Marcos was removed from power through the mostly-peaceful People Power revolution of 1986, the Reform the Armed Forces Movement launched numerous coups to overthrow the government, while conflicts continued with the MNLF, MILF, CCP, and smaller groups like the CPLA. Ideological differences in the CCP resulted in various groups who rejected its adherence to Maoist orthodoxy splitting into more than a dozen smaller groups, including the Revolutionary Workers' Party of the Philippines.

Red-tagging 

In recent years, international organizations including the United Nations, Amnesty International, and Human Rights Watch have called attention to the continued practice of red-tagging as a political tactic to stifle dissent in the Philippines. The practice, under which individuals or groups are labeled "communist" or "terrorist" regardless of their actual beliefs or affiliations, has been noted for frequently targeting human rights organizations, church or religious groups, health worker unions, the academe, and the mainstream media.

Religious extremist terrorism 
Brothers Abdurajik Abubakar Janjalani and Khadaffy Janjalani split from the MNLF in 1991 and established their own group, the Abu Sayyaf, which eventually became infamous for bombings, kidnappings, assassinations, extortion, rape, child sexual assault, forced marriage, drive-by shootings, extortion and drug trafficking. On July 23, 2014, Abu Sayyaf leader Isnilon Hapilon swore an oath of loyalty to Abu Bakr al-Baghdadi, the leader of the Islamic State of Iraq and the Levant (ISIL). In September 2014, the group began kidnapping people for ransom, in the name of ISIL.

However, in the leadup to the passage and signing of the Anti-Terror Act of 2020, President Rodrigo Duterte said that his administration would focus on "communists." He called the Abu Sayyaf "terrorists of no value," saying "Actually the number one threat to the country, hindi Abu Sayyaf, hindi mga terorista of no value. Itong high-value targets itong mga komunista" ("Actually the number one threat to the country is not the Abu Sayyaf Group, not terrorists of no value. The high-value targets are the communists")."

Legislative history

Human Security Act of 2007 

The Anti-Terrorism Act of 2020 repeals the Human Security Act of 2007, making changes to some of the provisions as well as the definitions under terrorism. Senator Panfilo Lacson, one of the principal authors of the Anti-Terrorism Act of 2020, said that the Human Security Act of 2007 was a "dead letter law" because it has been "severely underutilized" as it only resulted in a single convicted felon and had only one proscribed organization, the Abu Sayyaf.

Senate Bill No. 1083 
The bill was prepared by the Committees on National Defense and Security; Peace, Unification and Reconciliation; and Finance with the following as authors:

 Panfilo Lacson
 Lito Lapid
 Imee Marcos
 Bong Revilla
 Ronald "Bato" dela Rosa
 Tito Sotto

It was approved by the Senate on February 26, 2020 with the following 19 voting in the affirmative:

 Sonny Angara
 Nancy Binay
 Pia Cayetano
 Ronald "Bato" dela Rosa
 Minority Leader Franklin Drilon
 Grace Poe
 Imee Marcos
 Lito Lapid
 Joel Villanueva
 Cynthia Villar
 Manny Pacquiao
 Win Gatchalian
 Bong Go
 Richard J. Gordon
 Panfilo Lacson
 Bong Revilla
 Senate President Tito Sotto
 Francis Tolentino
 Majority Leader Juan Miguel Zubiri

The following senators dissented:
 Risa Hontiveros
 Kiko Pangilinan

House Bill No. 6875 
The bill was introduced by the following representatives and filed on May 30, 2020. Out of the 71 original authors, 15 members had their names stricken out as the authors of the controversial bill. The bill was approved on final reading on June 3, 2020, as an adoption of the earlier version approved by Senate. An additional 5 withdrew their authorship afterwards.

 Raneo E. Abu – Batangas, 2nd District
 Cyrille "Beng" F. Abueg-Zaldivar – Palawan, 2nd District
 Maria Fe R. Abunda – Eastern Samar, Lone District, withdrew authorship on June 2, 2020
 Resurreccion M. Acop – Antipolo, 2nd District
 Michael Edgar Y. Aglipay – Party List – DIWA
 Marlyn "Len" B. Alonte – Biñan, Lone District, withdrew authorship on June 2, 2020
 Cristal S. Bagatsing – Manila, 5th District, withdrew authorship on June 2, 2020
 Robert Ace S. Barbers – Surigao del Norte, 2nd District
 Julienne "Jam" A. Baronda – Iloilo City, Lone District, withdrew authorship on June 3, 2020
 Joseph Sto. Niño B. Bernos – Abra, Lone District
 Rozzano Rufino B. Biazon – Muntinlupa, Lone District, Principal author, later disowned bill as it "only copied Senate version". Withdrew authorship June 3, 2020
 Lianda B. Bolilia – Batangas, 4th District, withdrew authorship on June 3, 2020
 Juan Pablo "Rimpy" P. Bondoc – Pampanga, 4th District
 Narciso "Bong" Recio Bravo, Jr. – Masbate, 1st District
 Jorge "PATROL" Bustos – Party List – PATROL
 Argel Joseph T. Cabatbat – Party List – MAGSASAKA, withdrew authorship on June 2, 2020
 Manuel DG. Cabochan III – Party List – MAGDALO, withdrew authorship on June 2, 2020
 Arnold "Noli" D. Celeste – Pangasinan, 1st District
 Ma. Theresa V. Collantes – Batangas, 3rd District
 Anthony Peter "Onyx" D. Crisologo – Quezon City, 1st District, withdrew authorship on June 3, 2020
 Manuel Jose "Mannix" M. Dalipe – Zamboanga City, 2nd District
 Francisco G. Datol Jr. – Party List – SENIOR CITIZENS
 Presley C. De Jesus – Party List – PHILRECA
 Adriano A. Ebcas – Party List – AKO PADAYON PILIPINO
 Evelina G. Escudero – Sorsogon, 1st District, withdrew authorship on June 3, 2020
 Conrad M. Estrella III – Party List – ABONO
 Ria Cristina G. Fariñas – Ilocos Norte, 1st District, withdrew authorship on June 2, 2020
 Danilo "Dan" S. Fernandez – Laguna, 1st District
 Lawrence "Law" H. Fortun – Agusan del Norte, 1st District, withdrew authorship on June 2, 2020
 Pablo John F. Garcia – Cebu, 3rd District
 Ciriaco B. Gato Jr. – Batanes, Lone District
 Ruwel Peter S. Gonzaga – Davao de Oro, 2nd District
 Aurelio "Dong" D. Gonzales, Jr. – Pampanga, 3rd District, withdrew authorship on June 3, 2020
 Neptali M. Gonzales II – Mandaluyong, Lone District
 Michael B. Gorriceta – Iloilo, 2nd District, withdrew authorship on June 3, 2020
 Ferdinand L. Hernandez – South Cotabato, 2nd District, withdrew authorship on June 4, 2020
 Bernadette "BH" Herrera-Dy – Party List – BH, withdrew authorship on June 4, 2020
 Wilton "Tonton" Tan Kho – Masbate, 3rd District
 Loren Legarda – Antique, Lone District, requested name be removed after being "mistakenly" referred to as coauthor
 Dahlia A. Loyola – Cavite, 5th District
 Rodante D. Marcoleta – Party List – SAGIP
 Ruth Mariano-Hernandez – Laguna, 2nd District, withdrew authorship on June 2, 2020
 Francisco Jose "Bingo" F. Matugas II – Surigao del Norte, 1st District
 John Marvin "Yul Servo" C. Nieto – Manila, 3rd District, withdrew authorship on June 8, 2020
 Jericho Jonas "Koko" Bendigo Nograles – Party List – PBA
 Henry S. Oaminal – Misamis Occidental, 2nd District
 Joseph Stephen "Caraps" S. Paduano – Party List – ABANG LINGKOD
 Wilter "Sharky" Wee Palma II – Zamboanga Sibugay, 1st District
 Alberto "Bobby" Dapidran Pacquiao – Party List – OFW FAMILY
 Eddiebong G. Plaza – Agusan del Sur, 2nd District
 Roberto "Robbie" Villanueva Puno – Antipolo, 1st District
 Strike Bautista Revilla – Cavite, 2nd District
 Michael Odylon L. Romero – Party List – 1-PACMAN
 Ferdinand Martin Gomez Romualdez – Leyte, 1st District
 Xavier Jesus D. Romualdo – Camiguin, Lone District
 Rogelio Neil P. Roque – Bukidnon, 4th District
 Hector S. Sanchez – Catanduanes, Lone District
 Vilma Santos-Recto – Batangas, 6th District
 Edgar Mary S. Sarmiento – Samar, 1st District
 Deogracias Victor "DV" Savellano – Ilocos Sur, 1st District
 Rowena "Niña" O. Taduran – Party List – Party List ACT-CIS
 Samier A. Tan – Sulu, 1st District
 Sharee Ann T. Tan – Samar, 2nd District, withdrew authorship on June 3, 2020
 Jose "Ping-Ping" I. Tejada – North Cotabato, 3rd District, withdrew authorship on June 7, 2020
 John Reynald Marcelo Tiangco – Navotas, Lone District
 Jocelyn P. Tulfo – Party List – Party List ACT-CIS
 Raul "Boboy" C. Tupas – Iloilo, 5th District
 Vicente "Ching" S.E. Veloso – Leyte, 3rd District
 Luis Raymund "LRay" Favis Villafuerte, Jr. – Camarines Sur, 2nd District
 Camille A. Villar – Las Piñas, Lone District
 Eric Go Yap – Party List – Party List ACT-CIS

The House of Representatives voted 173–31 in favor of the bill, with 29 abstentions, but was corrected to 168–36 a day after to reflect corrections and retractions from members. The members voted in the plenary and via Zoom and recorded in their "All Members" Viber community

Republic Act No. 11479: Signing of the law 
The law was signed by President Rodrigo Duterte on July 3, 2020, in the midst of the ongoing COVID-19 pandemic and comes as part of the Philippines continued fight against terrorism in its borders. Proponents of the law have cited the siege of Marawi in 2017 as well as criminal activities from the Islamic State-linked Abu Sayyaf group, New People's Army Communist Rebels, and other supposed emerging threats to peace and public safety. According to Justice Secretary Menardo Guevarra, the law took effect on July 18, 2020, 15 days after it was published in the website of the Official Gazette. The Department of Justice released the law's implementing rules and regulations on October 16, 2020.

Proposal for repeal 
In 2022, Kabataan party-list Rep. Raoul Manuel, ACT Teachers party-list Rep. France Castro, and Gabriela women’s party-list Rep. Arlene Brosas filed a bill in Congress that sought to repeal the Anti-Terrorism Act of 2020, which supposedly violates the Philippines’ international commitment to uphold human rights.

Legal challenges in the Supreme Court 

The law is currently being challenged in the Supreme Court by multiple groups. Oral arguments began on February 2, 2021, after it was initially delayed due to the COVID-19 pandemic.

37 petitions were filed before the Supreme Court.

On December 9, 2021, the Supreme Court announced that except for the qualifier to the proviso in Section 4 of R.A. No. 11479, i.e., "… which are not intended to cause death or serious physical harm to a person, to endanger a person's life, or to create a serious risk to public safety" and the second method for designation in Section 25 paragraph 2 of the same law, i.e., "Request for designation by other jurisdictions or supranational jurisdictions," the rest of the challenged provisions of the law are declared not unconstitutional. It further advised the parties and the public to await the publication of the decision and the separate opinions for the explanation of the votes.

Responses and reactions

International

United States 
On July 15, 2020, 50 members of the United States Congress urged Ambassador Jose Manuel Romualdez to request the Government of the Philippines to consider repealing the "oppressive and unnecessary
legislation". The 50 representatives are:
Raul Grijalva (D) representing Arizona's 3rd congressional district
Mike Thompson (D) representing California's 5th congressional district
Barbara Lee (D) representing California's 13th congressional district
Jackie Speier (D) representing California's 14th congressional district
Eric Swalwell (D) representing California's 15th congressional district
Ro Khanna (D) representing California's 17th congressional district
Anna Eshoo (D) representing California's 18th congressional district
Judy Chu (D) representing California's 27th congressional district
Adam Schiff (D) representing California's 28th congressional district
Tony Cardenas (D) representing California's 29th congressional district
Jimmy Gomez (D) representing California's 34th congressional district
Gil Cisneros (D) representing California's 39th congressional district
Katie Porter (D) representing California's 45th congressional district
Alan Lowenthal (D) representing California's 47th congressional district
Juan Vargas (D) representing California's 51st congressional district
Susan Davis (D) representing California's 53rd congressional district
Rosa DeLauro (D) representing Connecticut's 3rd congressional district
Ted Deutch (D) representing Florida's 22nd congressional district
Hank Johnson (D) representing Georgia's 4th congressional district
Bobby Rush (D) representing Illinois's 1st congressional district
Jesus "Chuy" Garcia (D) representing Illinois's 4th congressional district
Danny K. Davis (D) representing Illinois's 7th congressional district
Jan Schakowsky (D) representing Illinois's 9th congressional district
Jamie Raskin (D) representing Maryland's 8th congressional district
Jim McGovern (D) representing Massachusetts' 2nd congressional district
Stephen F. Lynch (D) representing Massachusetts' 8th congressional district
Andy Levin (D) representing Michigan's 9th congressional district
Dean Phillips (D) representing Minnesota's 3rd congressional district
Betty McCollum (D) representing Minnesota's 4th congressional district
Ilhan Omar (D) representing Minnesota's 5th congressional district
Chris Smith (R) representing New Jersey's 4th congressional district
Deb Haaland (D) representing New Mexico's 1st congressional district
Nydia Velazquez (D) representing New York's 7th congressional district
Carolyn Maloney (D) representing New York's 12th congressional district
Adriano Espaillat (D) representing New York's 13th congressional district
Alexandria Ocasio-Cortez (D) representing New York's 14th congressional district
Jose E. Serrano (D) representing New York's 15th congressional district
Eliot Engel (D) representing New York's 16th congressional district
Paul Tonko (D)representing New York's 20th congressional district
Marcy Kaptur (D) representing Ohio's 9th congressional district
Suzanne Bonamici (D) representing Oregon's 1st congressional district
Earl Blumenauer (D) representing Oregon's 3rd congressional district
Brian Fitzpatrick (R) representing Pennsylvania's 1st congressional district
Eddie Bernice Johnson (D) representing Texas's 30th congressional district
Colin Allred (D) representing Texas's 32nd congressional district
Peter Welch (D) representing Vermont's at-large congressional district
Bobby Scott (politician) (D) representing Virginia's 3rd congressional district
Pramila Jayapal (D) representing Washington's 7th congressional district
Mark Pocan (D) representing Wisconsin's 2nd congressional district
Eleanor Holmes Norton (D) representing District of Columbia

United Nations 
On June 30, 2020, at the 44th regular session of the UN Human Rights Council in Geneva, Switzerland. The UN High Commissioner for Human Rights Michelle Bachelet has criticized the then proposed bill saying it could have a "chilling effect" on human rights work in the country and called for restraint on signing the bill from President Duterte.

Amnesty International 
Nicholas Bequelin, Amnesty International's Asia-Pacific Regional Director, has said upon hearing news of the law being signed:

Greenpeace 
The Southeast Asia office of Greenpeace urged the repeal of the Anti-Terrorism Act of 2020 due to its "sweeping definition of terrorism" which it said could be abused to stifle dissent.

Others 
The Washington Post called the bill's enactment as "another nail in the coffin of the Philippines' waning democracy." The Diplomat has stated that the law "takes aim at dissent." While Al Jazeera notes that the law is "poised to cause more terror." Various international artists have expressed dissent against the legislation, including Taylor Swift. Swedish environmental activist Greta Thunberg also joined the petition against anti-terrorism law.

Local

Bangsamoro Autonomous Region in Muslim Mindanao 
On July 2, 2020, the Bangsamoro Parliament passed a resolution urging President Rodrigo Duterte to veto the anti-terrorism bill, arguing that it would lead to abuses and would unfairly target Muslim Filipinos who have historically faced religious discrimination. After the passage of the bill into law, Chief Minister Murad Ebrahim released a statement saying that Bangsamoro regional government fully respects President Duterte's decision to sign the bill into law and that it would seek representation in the Anti-Terrorism Council. In response, presidential spokesperson Harry Roque pointed out that the law does not provide for a council seat for the Bangsamoro regional government although the same law mandates the council to coordinate with the autonomous region's government.

Philippine Independence Day protests 
More than 1,000 students and human rights activists gathered inside the UP Diliman campus on June 12, 2020, coinciding on 122nd Independence Day from Spanish colonial rule, dubbed it as "Grand Mañanita". They called for the government to "junk" the proposed bill stating fears that it would curtail basic human rights and freedom of speech and dissent. The rally was held despite a government ban on mass gatherings under the general community quarantine in Metro Manila and other parts of the country because of the pandemic. Protesters could be seen wearing masks and practicing social distancing. Similar demonstrations were held by activists in various cities such as Baguio, Legazpi, and Cebu City. Demonstrations were also held at other universities such as the De La Salle University in Manila. Activist Mae Paner also present at the event, dressed up like Metro Manila Police Chief Debold Sinas who was faced controversy over his birthday celebration on May 8, 2020, which the police called it "Mananita".

Churches and religious organizations 
The National Council of Churches in the Philippines, a fellowship of ten Philippine Protestant denominations, denounced the bill as "a travesty against God's will as it gives the government, or even just a few persons in the Anti-terrorism Council, the absolute power that determines what course people's lives will take by putting forward a very vague definition of terrorism." The Philippine Council of Evangelical Churches had likewise expressed reservations about the bill, saying "We firmly believe this Act imperils the rights of Filipinos and sense of dignity which, having its origin in God, our laws are called to uphold and protect." The PCEC specifically cited "vague definitions of terrorism, and the extended period of warrantless detention, which opens the way to serious abuses of a person's rights and dignity" as reasons for concern.

Others 
The National Federation of Peasant Women (Amihan) have said that the rising cases of red-tagging in the country confirm the prevalent criticisms against the controversial legislation. The Association of Major Religious Superiors in the Philippines (AMRSP), which brings together the heads of men and women religious orders in the country, have expressed their dissent against the law, which they say may "assault human dignity and human rights." Various Filipino artists have also expressed disappointment and dissent against the signing of the bill. Members of the Filipino art community have also expressed their dissent. But Dr. Rommel C. Banlaoi, Chairman of the Philippine Institute for Peace, Violence and Terrorism defends the need to have a new Philippine anti-terrorism law as threats of terrorism in the Philippines have escalated even during the COVID-19 pandemic. Nonetheless, Dr. Banlaoi encourages those opposed to the anti-terrorism law to continue what they are doing in order to remain vigilant and to ensure human rights protection during the implementation of the said law.

Celebrities, including former Miss Universe titlists Gloria Diaz, Pia Wurtzbach, and Catriona Gray, voiced their opposition to the bill.

Youth 
The UP Diliman also took a knee in solidarity with Black Lives Matter and the fight against police brutality after George Floyd was murdered by the police officer while being arrested for allegedly using a counterfeit bill in Minneapolis, Minnesota.

Seven protesters from University of the Philippines and one bystander who were condemning the controversial anti-terror bill were arrested in Cebu City for alleged violations of general community quarantine (GCQ) guidelines. Dubbed as "Cebu 8", the detainees have spent 36 hours in detention. PNP Central Visayas denied the allegations that they used excessive force to disperse the anti-terror bill protests.

Following the protests against the controversial anti-terrorism bill, several cloned Facebook accounts have been created on the platform. It started with University of the Philippines Cebu on June 6, 2020, who have been targeted by the newly created, duplicated Facebook accounts of themselves. It later targeted the residents in Metro Manila, Iloilo, Dumaguete, and Cagayan de Oro City, and other areas, who have engaged in protests against the bill. As a result, the hashtag #HandsOffOurStudents trended on Twitter, which the netizens condemned the creation of fake accounts. Department of Justice Secretary Menardo Guevarra expressed concern over the matter and ordered the agency's cybercrime division to coordinate with the NBI and the PNP to investigate the matter.

See also 
 List of Philippine laws
 Human Security Act of 2007
 Red-tagging in the Philippines
 Hong Kong National Security Law

References 

2020 in law
2020 in the Philippines
2020 controversies
Philippine legislation
Duterte administration controversies
Terrorism laws